Esselbach is a community in the Main-Spessart district in the Regierungsbezirk of Lower Franconia (Unterfranken) in Bavaria, Germany and a member of the Verwaltungsgemeinschaft (Administrative Community) of Marktheidenfeld.

Geography

Location
Belonging to Esselbach are the homesteads of Schleifthor, Alte Wachenmühle, Neue Wachenmühle, Faun and Karlshöhe. To Steinmark belong the Kieseckersmühle and the Heinrichsmühle. Schleifthor, Faun and Karlshöhe are part of the Löwensteiner Park, an otherwise unincorporated area.

History
As part of the Prince-Bishopric of Würzburg, the main centre of Esselbach and also Steinmark and Kredenbach as parts of the County of Wertheim passed after the Reichsdeputationshauptschluss in 1803 to the newly formed Principality of Aschaffenburg, with which it passed in 1814 (by this time it had become a department of the Grand Duchy of Frankfurt) to Bavaria. In the course of administrative reform in Bavaria, three communities came into being with the Gemeindeedikt (“Municipal Edict”) of 1818. In the course of later municipal reform in Bavaria, the three communities, Esselbach, Steinmark and Kredenbach, were amalgamated into one, called Esselbach.

Population development
Within town limits, 1,627 inhabitants were counted in 1970, 1,747 in 1987 and in 2000 2,041. In 2008, the population figure was the same as the year – 2,008.

Politics
The mayor is Richard Roos ([Christlich Soziale Union]), in office since 2013.

The 14 councillors have broken down by faction thus since the municipal election held in 2008:
- CSU-Bürgerblock: 5
- Freie Wähler: 4
- Bürgerliste/SPD: 3
- Bürgergemeinschaft: 2

Town partnerships
  Stetteldorf am Wagram, Lower Austria, Austria

Coat of arms
The community’s arms might be described thus: Vert a bend sinister argent surmounted by a post horn azure.

Economy and infrastructure

Education
As of 2006 the following institutions existed in Esselbach:
 A Catholic kindergarten with three groups
 A Universal Life private school going up to the 10th year
 A public primary school with three classes as part of the Bischbrunn Collective School (Verbandschule Bischbrunn).

References

Main-Spessart